This is a list of dialing codes in Greece. The first digit represents the type of service. 1 is used for short codes, 2 for geographical numbers (3 and 4 are reserved for that purpose too), 5 is used for inter-network routing purposes (non-dialable codes) and VPNs, 6 for mobile services, 7 is reserved for universal access numbers (not active), 8 for reduced-fee services (like 800 toll-free, 801 local call, 89 dial-up and data services), 9 is used for premium rate services (901 for general purpose and 909 for adult-only services). All dialable numbers are ten digits, except for short codes (3–5 digits in the 1 range), 807-XXXX (seven digits) used for calling card access codes, and numbers in the 5 range, used for routing purposes and not dialable by end-subscribers.

Overview
Geographical area codes start with the digit 2. There are currently two-, three-, and four-digit area codes. The only two-digit area code is 21 for the Athens Metropolitan area; three-digit codes are used for the cities Thessaloniki, Patras, Larissa, Heraklion, Kavala, and Tripoli. The rest of the codes are four-digit codes.

Generally speaking, the second digit of a geographical area code signifies a broader geographical area of Greece. That is how area codes are sorted in this article.

Two-digit codes are used with eight-digit subscriber numbers, three-digit codes with seven-digit numbers, and four-digit codes with six-digit numbers, so the full telephone number is always ten digits.

Subscriber numbers in most areas start with 0. That is the digit that was inserted between the area code and the subscriber number to form the new ten-digit numbering plan back in 2002. Thus, many Greeks erroneously think that the area codes include this leading 0. For example, they think that Athens's area code is 210 while, actually, Athens's area code is 21, with 0 being the first digit of the subscriber number.

Subscriber numbers starting with 0 are assigned to the former monopoly OTE. In bigger cities like Athens and Thessaloniki, subscriber numbers starting with digits other than 0 are becoming more and more common, especially amongst business subscribers. In this case, many people think that the area code is different. For example, a subscriber number in Athens might start with 211, with people thinking that 211 is a distinct area code from 210 while, in reality, both numbers are in the 21 area code and the third digit of the number belongs to the subscriber number.

The international call prefix depends on the country from which you are calling, for example, 00 for most European countries and 011 from North America.

In 2001-2002, Greece moved to a closed ten-digit numbering scheme in two stages, with the result that subscribers' numbers changed twice. For example, before the change, a number in Athens would have been dialed as follows:

In 2001, a '0' was added after the area code, which was incorporated into the subscriber's number:

Finally, in 2002, the leading '0' was changed to a '2' (for geographic numbers) :

For mobile phone numbers, the leading '0' was changed to a '6'.

Note that because of number portability, for both geographical and non-geographical (mobile, toll-free, premium rate) numbers, one cannot be sure about the operator that a number belongs to. All geographical codes (21x, 231x) end in a number from 0 to 6 (210 or 212 for Athens, 2310 or 2312 for Thessaloniki). Numbers whose code ends in "0" are or were originally operated by OTE. The same applies to mobile phones: All mobile codes (69x) end in 0,3,4,5,7,8 or 9 (690, 698). Mobile code "696" is assigned to OTE pagers. Numbers starting with 690 and 693 were originally assigned to WIND, with 694 and 695 to Vodafone, with 697 and 698 to Cosmote and with 699 to Q-Telecom until 2007 when it merged with WIND.

Zone 21: Greater Athens Metropolitan Area
21 - (0-9)XXXXXXX Athens-Piraeus-Elefsina area

Zone 22: Central Greece and the Aegean Islands

222x - Evia
2221 - Chalkida City
2222 - Kymi
2223 - Aliveri
2224 - Karystos
2226 - Aidipsos
2227 - Mantoudi
2228 - Psachna
2229 - Eretria

223x - Evrytania and Phthiotis
2231 - Lamia
2232 - Domokos
2233 - Atalanta
2234 - Amfikleia
2235 - Kamena Vourla
2236 - Spercheiada, Makrakomi
2237 - Karpenisi
2238 - Stylida
2239 - not used

224x - Dodecanese
2241 - Rhodes, Rhodes City
2242 - Kos and Nisyros islands
2243 - Kalymnos, Astypalaia
2244 - Rhodes Island, Archangelos Area
2245 - Karpathos and Kasos islands
2246 - Rhodes Island, Salakos Area - Chalki, Kastellorizo, Symi and Tilos islands
2247 - Agathonisi, Leros, Leipsoi and Patmos islands
2248 and 2249 - not used

225x - Lesbos, Lemnos
2251 - Lesbos, Mytilini Area
2252 - Lesbos, Agiasos Area
2253 - Lesbos, Kalloni Area
2254 - Lemnos, Agios Efstratios
2255 through 2259 - not used

226x - Boeotia, eastern Phocis
2261 - Livadia
2262 - Thiva
2263 - Dervenochoria, Villia
2264 - Thisvi
2265 - Amfissa
2266 - Lidoriki
2267 - Arachova, Distomo
2268 - Aliartos
2269 - not used

227x - Chios, Samos and Icaria islands
2271 - Chios, Town Area
2272 - Chios, Kardamyla Area
2273 - Samos
2274 - Chios, Volissos Area - Psara island
2275 - Ikaria, Fournoi island
2276 through 2279 - not used

228x - Cyclades
2281 - Syros, including Kythnos, Serifos  islands
2282 - Andros
2283 - Tinos
2284 - Paros and Sifnos islands
2285 - Amorgos and Naxos islands
2286 - Folegandros, Ios, Santorini and Sikinos islands
2287 - Kimolos and Milos
2288 - Kea Island
2289 - Mykonos

229x - Attica, excluding the area that uses 21
2291 - Lagonissi
2292 - Lavrio, Sounio
2293 - Agia Sotira
2294 - Rafina, Artemida, Marathonas
2295 - Afidnes
2296 - Megara, Kineta 
2297 - Aigina
2298 - Troezen, Poros isl., Hydra isl., Spetses isl.
2299 - Markopoulo Mesogaias

Zone 23: Central Macedonia and Florina

231 - Thessaloniki
231 - (0-9)XXXXXX Thessaloniki

232x - Serres prefecture
2321 - Serres
2322 - Nigrita
2323 - Sidirokastro
2324 - Nea Zichni
2325 - Heraklia
2327 - Rodopoli
2326, 2328 & 2329 - not used

233x - Imathia prefecture
2331 - Veria (Verroia)
2332 - Naoussa
2333 - Alexandria
2334 through 2339 - not used

234x - Kilkis prefecture
2341 - Kilkis
2343 - Polykastro
2342 and 2344 through 2349 - not used

235x - Pieria prefecture
2351 - Katerini
2352 - Litochoro
2353 - Aiginio
2354 through 2359 - not used

237x - Chalkidiki prefecture
2371 - Polygyros
2372 - Arnaia
2373 - Nea Moudania
2374 - Potidaia
2375 - Nikiti
2376 - Stratoni
2377 - Ierissos, Mount Athos
2378 and 2379 - not used

238x - Pella and Florina prefectures
2381 - Edessa
2382 - Giannitsa
2383 - not used
2384 - Aridaia
2385 - Florina
2386 - Amyntaio
2387 through 2389 - not used

239x - parts of Chalkidiki and Thessaloniki prefectures
2391 - Chalkidona
2392 - Peraia
2393 - Lagkadikia
2394 - Lagkadas
2395 - Sochos
2396 - Vasilika
2397 - Asprovalta
2399 - Nea Kallikrateia

236x is not used.

Zone 24: Thessaly and West Macedonia (excluding Florina)

241 - Larissa area
241 - (0-7)XXXXXX Larissa (and area)

242x - Magnesia including the Northern Sporades
2421 - Volos
2422 - Almyros
2423 - Kala Nera
2424 - Skopelos
2425 - Velestino
2426 - Zagora
2427 - Skiathos
2428 - Keramidi, suburban Volos
2429 - not used

243x - Trikala prefecture
2431 - Trikala
2432 - Kalampaka
2433 - Farkadona
2434 - Pyli
2435 through 2439 - not used

244x - Karditsa
2441 - Karditsa
2442 - not used
2443 - Sofades
2444 - Palamas
2445 - Mouzaki
2446 through 2449 - not used

246x - West Macedonia excluding the Florina area
2461 - Kozani
2462 - Grevena
2463 - Ptolemaida
2464 - Servia
2465 - Siatista
2466 - not used
2467 - Kastoria
2468 - Neapoli
2469 - not used

249x - Larissa prefecture except for the Larissa area
2491 - Farsala
2492 - Tyrnavos
2493 - Elassona
2494 - Agia
2495 - Makrychori
2496 through 2499 - not used

245x, 247x and 248x are not used.

Zone 25: East Macedonia and Thrace

251 - Kavala area
251: Kavala or Kavalla

252x - Drama prefecture
2521 - Drama
2522 - Prosotsani
2523 - Kato Nevrokopi
2524 - Paranesti
2525 through 2559 - not used

253x - Rhodope prefecture
2531 - Komotini
2532 - Sapes
2533 - Xylagani
2534 - Iasmos
2535 - Nea Kallisti
2536 through 2539 - not used

254x- Xanthi prefecture
2541 - Xanthi
2542 - Stavroupoli
2543 - not used
2544 - Echinos
2545 through 2549 - not used

255x - Evros Prefecture
2551: Alexandroupolis
2552: Orestiada
2553 - Didymoteicho
2554 - Soufli
2555 - Feres
2556 - Kyprinos
2557 through 2559 - not used

259x - Kavala prefecture except for the Kavala area
2591 - Chrysoupoli
2592 - Eleftheroupoli
2593 - Thasos
2594 - Nea Peramos, Kavala
2595 through 2599 - not used

256x through 258x are not used.

Zone 26: West Greece, Ionian Island and Epirus

261 - Patras and Area
261 - Patras (and area)

262x - Ileias Prefecture
2621 - Pyrgos
2622 - Amaliada
2623 - Lechaina
2624 - Olympia
2625 - Krestena
2626 - Andritsaina
2627 through 2629 - not used

263x - Aetolia and western Phocis
2631 - Missolonghi
2632 - Etoliko
2634 - Nafpaktos
2635 - Mataranga, Aetolia-Acarnania
2633 and 2636 through 2639 - not used

264x - Acarnania, Lefkada
2641 - Agrinio
2642 - Amfilochia
2643 - Vonitsa
2644 - Thermo
2645 - Lefkada
2646 - Astakos
2647 - Fyteies
2648 and 2649 - not used

265x - Ioannina Prefecture
2651 - Ioannina
2652 - not used
2653 - Asprangeli
2654 - Metamorfosi
2655 - Konitsa
2656 - Metsovo
2657 - Delvinaki
2658 - Zitsa
2659 - Kalentzi

266x - Corfu prefecture and Thesprotia
2661 - Corfu (city)
2662 - Lefkimmi
2663 - Northern Corfu
2664 - Filiates
2665 - Igoumenitsa
2666 - Paramythia
2667 through 2669 - not used

267x - Kefalonia
2671 - Argostoli (central and western Kefalonia)
2674 - Sami (Eastern Kefalonia and Ithaca)
2672, 2673 and 2675 through 2679 - not used

268x - Arta and Preveza
2681 - Arta
2682 - Preveza
2683 - Filippiada
2684 - Kanalaki
2685 - Athamania
2686 through 2689 - not used

269x - Achaea (except Patras) and Zakynthos
2691 - Aegion/Aigion
2692 - Kalavryta
2693 - Kato Achaia
2694 - Chalandritsa
2695 - the island of Zakynthos
2696 - Akrata
2697 through 2699 - not used

Zone 27: Peloponnese and Kythera

271 - Tripoli and area
271: Tripoli (and area)

272x - southern and eastern part of Messenia
2721 - Kalamata
2722 - Messene
2723 - Pylos
2724 - Meligalas
2725 - Koroni
2726 through 2729 - not used

273x - Laconia and Kythera
2731: Sparta
2732: Monemvasia
2733: Gythio
2734: Neapoli
2735: Skala
2736: Kythera
2737 through 2739 - not used

274x - Corinthia
2741 - Corinth (and area)
2742 - Kiato
2743 - Xylokastro
2744 - Loutraki
2746 - Nemea
2747 - Stymfalia
2748 and 2749 - not used

275x - eastern Arcadia and Argolis
2751 - Argos
2752 - Nafplio
2753 - Lygourio
2754 - Kranidi
2755 - Astros
2756 - not used
2757 - Leonidio
2758 and 2759 - not used

276x - Messenia
2761 - Kyparissia
2763 - Gargalianoi
2765 - Kopanaki
2762, 2764 and 2766 through 2769 - not used

279x - Western Arcadia
2791 - Megalopoli
2792 - Kastri Kynourias
2795 - Vytina
2796 - Levidi
2797 - Tropaia
2793, 2794, 2798 and 2799 - not used

277x and 278x are not used.

Zone 28: Crete

281 - Heraklion prefecture
281 - Heraklion (and area)

282x - Chania prefecture
2821 - Chania
2822 - Kissamos
2823 - Kantanos
2824 - Kolymvari
2825 - Apokoronas
2826 through 2829 - not used

283x - Rethymno prefecture
2831 - Rethymno
2832 - Spyli
2833 - Amari
2834 - Perama Mylopotamou
2835 through 2839 - not used

284x - Lasithi
2841 - Agios Nikolaos
2842 - Ierapetra
2843 - Siteia
2844 - Tzermadio
2845 through 2849 - not used

289x - rest of Heraklion prefecture
2891 - Arkalochori
2892 - Moires
2893 - Asterousia
2894 - Agia Varvara
2895 - Ano Viannos
2896 - not used
2897 - Limenas Chersonisou
2898 and 2899 - not used

285x through 288x are not used.

Non-geographic numbers
100 - Hellenic Police 
101x up to 103x
105x up to 107x
102xx up to 107xx
108 - Hellenic Coast Guard
109 - Hellenic Police - Drugs-related issues
110xx
111xx
11188 - Cyber Crime Division of Hellenic Policy
11185 - Athens Urban Transport Organisation (OASA) & Thessaloniki Urban Transport Organization (OASTH)
110x, 111x
112 - European emergency number
113xx up to 116xx
113x up to 118x
116xxx - Pan-European numbers
117xx
118xx - Directory services
119
12x, 12xx, 13x, 13xx - Network customer services (specific to each carrier)
137xx - Toll Free Technical Support (free from all carriers)
13777 Yuboto Telephony Support 
138xx - Customer service and sales for telephone companies (accessible from all networks)
13890 - Inter Telecom
14xx - Telephone companies' music voice portals
140xx
142xx up to 149xx- Information services (weather, news etc.)
15xx - National public services (public sector numbers)
151xx up to 156xx
1571 - Hellenic Policy. A service available in Greek, English, French and German. Greek and foreign tourists can use it to solve problems they may encounter. 
159xx
166 - EKAV 
170 - Special Suppressive Anti-Terrorist Unit
171 - Tourist Police
186x up to 189x
181xx, 182xx, 183xx - Short codes for private companies
188xx - Short codes for private companies
196x - National public services (public sector numbers)
190xx up to 195xx
197 - National Centre for Social Solidarity (EKKA) 
199 - Fire department

50x xxx xxxx - VPNs
54xxx
559xx

685 185 xxxx - CYTA Hellas
685 19x xxxx - CYTA Hellas
685 500 xxxx - CYTA Hellas
685 505 xxxx - CYTA Hellas
685 550 xxxx - CYTA Hellas
685 555 xxxx - CYTA Hellas
685 585 xxxx - CYTA Hellas
690 000 xxxx - BWS
690 002 xxxx - Nova (Forthnet) 
690 003 xxxx - Nova (Forthnet) 
690 069 xxxx - Nova (Forthnet) 
690 100 xxxx - MI CARRIER SERVICES AB
690 200 xxxx - MI CARRIER SERVICES AB
690 300 xxxx - MI CARRIER SERVICES AB
690 400 xxxx - MI CARRIER SERVICES AB
690 500 xxxx - MI CARRIER SERVICES AB
690 555 xxxx - AMD Telecom S.A. 
690 6xx xxxx - WIND Hellas
690 7xx xxxx - WIND Hellas
690 8xx xxxx - WIND Hellas
690 9xx xxxx - WIND Hellas
691 000 xxxx - BWS
691 111 xxxx - Interconnect
691 200 xxxx - Yuboto LTD 
691 234 xxxx - M-Stat 
691 300 xxxx - Viva 
691 345 xxxx - Nova (Forthnet) 
691 400 xxxx - AMD Telecom S.A.
691 500 xxxx - My Company Projects
691 600 xxxx - Compatel Limited
691 691 xxxx - Mobile Media 
691 700 xxxx - Inter Telecom 
691 888 xxxx - Hellenic Railways Organisation (OSE)
693 xxx xxxx - WIND Hellas
694 xxx xxxx - Vodafone Greece
695 000 xxxx up to 695 199 xxxx - Vodafone Greece
695 200 xxxx - Compatel Limited
695 210 xxxx - MI CARRIER SERVICES AB
695 290 xxxx - MI CARRIER SERVICES AB
695 299 xxxx - BWS
695 30x xxxx - CYTA Hellas
695 310 xxxx - MI CARRIER SERVICES AB
695 330 xxxx - Apifon
695 340 xxxx - AMD Telecom S.A.
695 400 xxxx - AMD Telecom S.A.
695 410 xxxx - MI CARRIER SERVICES AB
695 423 xxxx - Infobip
695 490 xxxx - MI CARRIER SERVICES AB
695 500 xxxx up to 695 999 xxxx - Vodafone Greece
696 01x xxxx - OTE
696 91x xxxx - Greek Ministry of National Defense
696 921 xxxx up to 696 928 xxxx - Greek Ministry of National Defense
697 xxx xxxx - Cosmote
698 xxx xxxx - Cosmote
699 00x xxxx - WIND Hellas
699 1xx xxxx up to 699 999 xxxx - WIND Hellas

70x xxx xxxx - Universal Personal Number Service

800 xxx xxxx - Toll-free numbers
801 xxx xxxx - “ONEphone” shared-cost services (local call charges apply nationwide)
806 xxx xxxx - Calls with maximum charge of 0.06 EUR/minute
807 xxxx - Phonecard services
812 xxx xxxx - Calls with maximum charge of 0.12 EUR/minute
825 xxx xxxx - Calls with maximum charge of 0.25 EUR/minute
850 xxx xxxx - Calls with maximum charge of 0.50 EUR/minute
875 xxx xxxx - Calls with maximum charge of 0.75 EUR/minute

896 xxx xxxx & 899 xxx xxxx - Data services (Dial-up Internet access, Hellaspac packet relay, ERMES email etc.)

901 xxx xxxx - Premium-rate services
909 xxx xxxx - Premium-rate adult-only services

See also 
Telephone numbers in Europe
OTE

References

External links
List of area codes in Greece
 International Dialing Resource Center - Greek area/dialing codes
EETT (Regulator) page on numbering (English)
Greece dialing codes
EETT numbering page (Greek)

Greece
 
Dialing codes of Greece numerically